The 2015–16 OHL season was the 36th season of the Ontario Hockey League, in which twenty teams played 68 games each according to the regular season schedule, from September 2015 to March 2016. The Plymouth Whalers relocated to Flint and became the Flint Firebirds, playing at the Dort Federal Credit Union Event Center. The Belleville Bulls relocated to Hamilton and became the Hamilton Bulldogs, playing at FirstOntario Centre. The London Knights won the J. Ross Robertson Cup for the fourth time in franchise history, as they defeated the Niagara IceDogs in four games in the final round of the playoffs.  The Knights qualified for the 2016 Memorial Cup held at the ENMAX Centrium in Red Deer, Alberta.  London defeated the Rouyn-Noranda Huskies 3-2 in overtime in the final game, winning the Memorial Cup for the second time in franchise history.

Regular season

Final standings
Note: DIV = Division; GP = Games played; W = Wins; L = Losses; OTL = Overtime losses; SL = Shootout losses; GF = Goals for; GA = Goals against; PTS = Points; x = clinched playoff berth; y = clinched division title; z = clinched conference title

Eastern conference

Western conference

Scoring leaders
Note: GP = Games played; G = Goals; A = Assists; Pts = Points; PIM = Penalty minutes

Leading goaltenders
Note: GP = Games played; Mins = Minutes played; W = Wins; L = Losses: OTL = Overtime losses; SL = Shootout losses; GA = Goals Allowed; SO = Shutouts; GAA = Goals against average

Playoffs

Conference quarterfinals

Eastern conference quarterfinals

(1) Kingston Frontenacs vs. (8) Oshawa Generals

(2) Barrie Colts vs. (7) Mississauga Steelheads

(3) North Bay Battalion vs. (6) Peterborough Petes

(4) Niagara IceDogs vs. (5) Ottawa 67's

Western conference quarterfinals

(1) Erie Otters vs. (8) Saginaw Spirit

(2) Sarnia Sting vs. (7) Sault Ste. Marie Greyhounds

(3) London Knights vs. (6) Owen Sound Attack

(4) Kitchener Rangers vs. (5) Windsor Spitfires

Conference semifinals

Eastern conference semifinals

(1) Kingston Frontenacs vs. (4) Niagara IceDogs

(2) Barrie Colts vs. (3) North Bay Battalion

Western conference semifinals

(1) Erie Otters vs. (7) Sault Ste. Marie Greyhounds

(3) London Knights vs. (4) Kitchener Rangers

Conference finals

Eastern conference finals

(2) Barrie Colts vs. (4) Niagara IceDogs

Western conference finals

(1) Erie Otters vs. (3) London Knights

J. Ross Robertson Cup

(W3) London Knights vs. (E4) Niagara IceDogs

J. Ross Robertson Cup Champions Roster

Playoff scoring leaders
Note: GP = Games played; G = Goals; A = Assists; Pts = Points; PIM = Penalty minutes

Playoff leading goaltenders

Note: GP = Games played; Mins = Minutes played; W = Wins; L = Losses: OTL = Overtime losses; SL = Shootout losses; GA = Goals Allowed; SO = Shutouts; GAA = Goals against average

Awards

All-Star teams
The OHL All-Star Teams were selected by the OHL's General Managers.

First team
Christian Dvorak, Centre, London Knights
Matthew Tkachuk, Left Wing, London Knights
Mitch Marner, Right Wing, London Knights
Mikhail Sergachev, Defence, Windsor Spitfires
Rasmus Andersson, Defence, Barrie Colts
Mackenzie Blackwood, Goaltender, Barrie Colts
Kris Knoblauch, Coach, Erie Otters

Second team
Mike Amadio, Centre, North Bay Battalion
Andrew Mangiapane, Left Wing, Barrie Colts
Kevin Labanc, Right Wing, Barrie Colts
Travis Dermott, Defence, Erie Otters
Jakob Chychrun, Defence, Sarnia Sting
Devin Williams, Goaltender, Erie Otters
Rocky Thompson, Coach, Windsor Spitfires

Third team
Dylan Strome, Centre, Erie Otters
Alexander Nylander, Left Wing, Mississauga Steelheads
Alex DeBrincat, Right Wing, Erie Otters
Olli Juolevi, Defence, London Knights
Roland McKeown, Defence, Kingston Frontenacs
Alex Nedeljkovic, Goaltender, Niagara IceDogs
Mike Van Ryn, Coach, Kitchener Rangers

2016 OHL Priority Selection
On April 9, 2016, the OHL conducted the 2016 Ontario Hockey League Priority Selection. The Guelph Storm held the first overall pick in the draft, and selected Ryan Merkley from the Toronto Jr. Canadiens of the GTHL. Merkley was awarded the Jack Ferguson Award, awarded to the top pick in the draft.

Below are the players who were selected in the first round of the 2016 Ontario Hockey League Priority Selection.

2016 NHL Entry Draft
On June 24–25, 2016, the National Hockey League conducted the 2016 NHL Entry Draft held at the First Niagara Center in Buffalo, New York. In total, 48 players from the Ontario Hockey League were selected in the draft. Olli Juolevi of the London Knights was the first player from the OHL to be selected, as he was taken with the fifth overall pick by the Vancouver Canucks.

Below are the players selected from OHL teams at the NHL Entry Draft.

2016 CHL Import Draft
On June 28, 2016, the Canadian Hockey League conducted the 2016 CHL Import Draft, in which teams in all three CHL leagues participate in. The Guelph Storm held the first pick in the draft by a team in the OHL, and selected Dmitri Samorukov from Russia with their selection.

Below are the players who were selected in the first round by Ontario Hockey League teams in the 2016 CHL Import Draft.

References

Ontario Hockey League seasons
Ohl